The Bachman Books is a collection of short novels by Stephen King published under the pseudonym Richard Bachman between 1977 and 1982. It made The New York Times Best Seller List upon its release in 1985.

History
The book was released in 1985 after the publication of the first hardcover Bachman novel Thinner in order to introduce Bachman to fans who did not know about King's work under this pseudonym (little of which was still in circulation at the time). This omnibus also collected these early novels in hardcover for the first time, as they were all originally published in paperback. It opens with an introduction by King called "Why I Was Bachman", explaining how and why he took on the persona of Richard Bachman, as well as how it was found out by the public. Another version with a new introduction "The Importance of Being Bachman" was published in 1996 to coincide with the release of a new Bachman novel The Regulators.

Contents
Novels collected in The Bachman Books:

Rage (1977)
The Long Walk (1979)
Roadwork (1981)
The Running Man (1982)

Editions
The US editions of this collection and the novel Rage were allowed to go out of print by the author and publisher because of the Heath High School shooting. The remaining three novels are still in print and are published as separate books.

The Bachman Books is still in print in the United Kingdom although it no longer contains Rage. In a footnote to the preface of the more recent Bachman novel Blaze (dated 30 January 2007) King wrote of Rage: "Now out of print, and a good thing."

References

1985 American novels
Novels by Richard Bachman
American speculative fiction novels